The K or Nova Zemlya Island, sometimes referred to as the Island of Happiness, is a young island of the Black Sea. The island is divided between Romania (40%) and Ukraine (60%).

Geography

It started forming in the early 2000s, is made out of sand, but in the recent years, forms of vegetation have appeared. The K Island and the Sacalin Island are Romania's newest territories and are continuing to grow.

See also
List of divided islands

References 

International islands
Islands of the Black Sea
Islands of Romania
Islands of Ukraine